A dream is an experience during sleep.

Dream may also refer to:

Art

Paintings
 Le Rêve (Detaille), an 1888 painting by Édouard Detaille
 Le Rêve (Picasso) (The Dream in French), 1932 oil painting by Pablo Picasso
 The Dream, a painting by Salvador Dalí
 The Dream (Rousseau painting), by Henri Rousseau

Sculptures
 The Dream, a 2008 work by Damien Hirst, a simulated unicorn in a tank of formaldehyde solution
 The Dream (sculpture), a 1998 outdoor bronze of Martin Luther King, Jr. by Michael Florin Dente in Portland, Oregon
 Dream (sculpture), a 2009 public art work by Jaume Plensa in Sutton, St Helens, Merseyside

Books
 "A Dream", a 1924 short story by W. Somerset Maugham
 "The Dream", a Hercule Poirot short story by Agatha Christie in the 1960 collection The Adventure of the Christmas Pudding
 Dream (comics), a character in The Sandman
 "The Dream" (John Donne poem), 1635
 "The Dream" (Lord Byron poem), 1816
 The Dream (novel), by H. G. Wells
 "The Dream" (short story), an 1832 short story by Mary Shelley
 The Dreme, a 1528 poem by Scottish poet David Lyndsay

Business and brands
 Dream (chocolate), a candy bar

Film and TV

Films
 The Dream (1911 film), an American short film
 The Dream (1931 film), a French film directed by Jacques de Baroncelli
 The Dream (1964 film), a Soviet Ukrainian film about Taras Shevchenko
 The Dream (1966 film), a Yugoslavian war film
 The Dream (1985 film), directed by Pieter Verhoeff
 The Dream (1987 film), a Syrian documentary
 The Dream (1989 film), a television film starring Jeremy Irons
 Dream (2008 film), a South Korean film
 Dream (2012 film), an Indian Telugu-language thriller
 Dream (2023 film), a South Korean sports drama film

Television

Series
 Dream (TV series), a South Korean TV drama
 The Dream with Roy and HG, an Australian talk show

Episodes
 "The Dream", an Agatha Christie's Poirot episode

TV related companies
 Dream Multimedia, makers of the Dreambox satellite TV receiver
 Dream Satellite TV, a broadcasting service

Gaming
 Dream (YouTuber), an American YouTuber and Minecraft player
 Project Dream, an unreleased video game, redeveloped as Banjo-Kazooie

Music
 The Dream (ballet), a 1964 one-act ballet, with choreography by Frederick Ashton, based on A Midsummer Night's Dream using Mendelssohn's music
 Dream (musical), a 1997 stage show
 Dream pop, a subgenre of alternative rock music
 Dream trance, a subgenre of trance music
 Dreamlike (EP), an EP by The Boyz

Artists
 D:Ream, a Northern Irish pop and dance group
 Dream (American group), a pop girl group
 Dream (Japanese group), a pop girl group
 The-Dream (born 1977), American R&B artist
 NCT Dream, a South Korean-Chinese boy group and subunit of NCT

Albums
 Dream, by Jaclyn Victor, 2002
 Dream, by Michelle Tumes, 2001
 Dream (Ai album), 2022
 The Dream (alt-J album), 2022
 Dream (Angie Stone album), 2015
 Dream (Captain & Tennille album), 1978
 The Dream (In This Moment album), 2008
 The Dream (John & Audrey Wiggins album), 1997
 Dream (Keller Williams album), 2007
 Dream (Kitarō album), 1992
 Dream (Michael Bublé album), 2002
 The Dream (Open Hand album), 2003
 The Dream (The Orb album), 2007
 Dream (Roland Hanna album), 2002
 The Dream (Sanctus Real album), 2014
 Dream (TrueBliss album), 1999
 Dream (Yuna Ito album), 2009
 The Dream 1973-2011, a 2012 compilation album by Michael Franks
 Dream (Cliff Richard and the Shadows EP), 1961
 Dream (Jeong Eun-ji EP), 2016
 Dream (Seventeen EP)

Songs
 "#9 Dream", 1974 song by John Lennon
 "D.R.E.A.M.", a 2019 song by Miley Cyrus
 "D.R.E.A.M.", by JoJo Siwa
 "Dream", by Anza
 "Dream", by Golden Earring from the album Winter-Harvest
 "Dream", by Imagine Dragons from the album Smoke + Mirrors
 "Dream", by Mami Kawada from the album Savia
 "Dream", by Tally Hall from the album Marvin's Marvelous Mechanical Museum
 "The Dream", by The Moody Blues from the album On the Threshold of a Dream
 "Dream", by OneRepublic from the album Oh My My
 "Dream", by P. Lion, an Italian singer
 "Dream", by Priscilla Ahn from her album A Good Day, featured in Grey's Anatomy
 "Dream", by White Lion from the album Return of the Pride
 "Dream" (1944 song), a 1944 jazz and pop standard written by Johnny Mercer
 "Dream" (Dizzee Rascal song), 2004
 "The Dream (Hold on to Your Dream)", by Irene Cara from the album What a Feelin'
 "Dream" (Roko Blažević song), 2019 song that represented Croatia in the Eurovision Song Contest 2019
 "Dream" (Suzy and Baekhyun song), 2016
 "Dream, Dream", by Kissng the Pink (KTP) from the album Certain Things Are Likely
 "Dream Song", by John Fogerty from the album John Fogerty
 "Dream Song", by Scott Matthews from the album Passing Stranger
 "Dream Song", by Joe Satriani from the album Black Swans and Wormhole Wizards

Programs
 DREAM Act, an American legislative proposal related to immigration
 DREAM Drug Resource Enhancement against Aids and Malnutrition, an AIDS therapy program

Science and technology
 DREAM (protocol), a location-based routing protocol
 DREAM (software), a computer programming tool
 HTC Dream, a smartphone
 Project DReaM, a digital rights management implementation
 Sophomore's dream, a pair of mathematical identities discovered in 1697 by Johann Bernoulli

Sports
 Hakeem Olajuwon (born 1963), nicknamed "The Dream", a Nigerian-American basketball player
 Dream (mixed martial arts)
 Atlanta Dream, an American women's basketball team

Vehicles
 Airdrome Dream Classic, a model of aircraft
 Antonov An-225 Mriya, cargo aircraft frequently referred to under its translated name "Dream"
 Honda Dream (disambiguation), various models of Honda motorcycles

Ships
 Dream, a cruise ship built in 1970, now sailing as the MS Formosa Queen
 Disney Dream, a 2010 cruise ship operated by Disney
 Dream-class cruise ship, a cruise ship class operated by Carnival
 Carnival Dream, the lead vessel of the class

See also
 A Dream (disambiguation)
 Dreamer (disambiguation)
 The Dreamer (disambiguation)
 The Dreamers (disambiguation)
 Dreaming (disambiguation)
 Dreams (disambiguation)
 Dreamy (disambiguation)
 Le Rêve (disambiguation) ( in French)
 Andria "Dreamz" Herd, a Survivor contestant
 Wish, a hope or desire for something